Belleville is an unincorporated community in Jasper County, Missouri, United States.

History
Belleville was named after a mining official. Variant names were "Bellville" and "Zincite". A post office called Zincite was established in 1885, and remained in operation until 1918.

References

Unincorporated communities in Jasper County, Missouri
Unincorporated communities in Missouri